Vjekoslav Andrić (born 5 August 1992) is a Slovenian footballer who plays as a goalkeeper.

References

External links
PrvaLiga profile 

1992 births
Living people
Footballers from Ljubljana
Slovenian footballers
Association football goalkeepers
NK Domžale players
Slovenian Second League players
Slovenian PrvaLiga players